Art Association NYTE ry is founded in 1987 in Pori as an artist group and art association. It is as a launching platform for young artists in Satakunta Region.

Art Association NYTE ry begun as an interdisciplinary artist group which included artists from various fields including, fine-art, Cinema and Live-Arts.

Many of NYTE's activities take place in the social centre 3h+k. Which translates as three rooms and a kitchen. It includes a theatre, gallery space and computer resource room. There is also an outside yard used for some performances and was started in the 1980s.

References

Social centres